Pitkevitch Glacier is a glacier, 20 nautical miles (37 km) long, flowing north from the Admiralty Mountains along the west side of DuBridge Range. The glacier reaches the sea just east of Atkinson Cliffs, where it forms Anderson Icefalls. A portion of the terminus merges northwestward with Fendley Glacier. Mapped by United States Geological Survey (USGS) from surveys and U.S. Navy air photos, 1960–63. Named by Advisory Committee on Antarctic Names (US-ACAN) for Staff Sergeant, Leonard M. Pitkevitch, United States Air Force (USAF), who perished in the crash of a C-124 Globemaster aircraft in this vicinity in 1958.

Glaciers of Pennell Coast